The Santa Claus Cup is an annual international figure skating competition organized by the Hungarian National Skating Federation. It is held annually in late November or early December in Budapest, Hungary. Medals are awarded in the disciplines of men's singles, ladies' singles, and ice dance at various levels which may include senior, junior, novice, and below.

Senior medalists

Men

Women

Ice dance

Junior medalists

Men

Women

Ice dance

Advanced novice medalists

Men

Women

Ice dance

References

External links 
 Hungarian National Skating Federation

International figure skating competitions hosted by Hungary
Figure skating in Hungary